Abdoulaye Sar served as the Director of Community Development of the World Scout Bureau.

In 1997, he was awarded the 262nd Bronze Wolf, the only distinction of the World Organization of the Scout Movement, awarded by the World Scout Committee for exceptional services to world Scouting.

References

External links

Year of birth missing
Scouting and Guiding in Senegal
Recipients of the Bronze Wolf Award